Septemvri is a town in Pazardzhik Province, Southern Bulgaria, located at the western end of the Upper Thracian Lowland,  away to the west from the city of Pazardzhik. It is the administrative centre of homonymous Septemvri Municipality. As of December 2009, the town has a population of 8,422 inhabitants.

History
Four Thracian mounds and traces of two ancient cities - Greek Pistiros and a Roman town  that lies on Trayan's Drum were discovered near the town. It has succeeded as an old Bulgarian settlement, which was destroyed in the late 14th century during the Ottoman onslaught. The town was rebuilt at the end of the 15th century under the Turkish name of Sara Khan bey, after the liberation from Ottoman occupation in the beginning of the 20th century the name was changed to "Saranyovo",which later became Septemvri following the communist party's accend to power 

Septemvri developed into a typical railway town following the construction of the Haskovo–Belovo railway line in 1873. The scenic Septemvri-Dobrinishte narrow gauge line to the Rhodopi mountain town of Dobrinishte over Bansko was constructed in 1945. In 1949 the Bulgarian Communist Party renamed the town Septemvri, the new name literally meaning "September", in honour of the September Uprising of 1923.

References

Towns in Bulgaria
Populated places in Pazardzhik Province